The Church of Jesus Christ of Latter-day Saints in New Caledonia refers to the Church of Jesus Christ of Latter-day Saints (LDS Church) and its members in New Caledonia. At year-end 1983, there were about 100 members in New Caledonia. In 2021, there were 2,483 members in 9 congregations.

History

Some Servicemen passed through Tahiti during World War II.  Beginning in the late 1950's church members, primarily from Tahiti, would come to New Caledonia to find work. Initially informal meetings were held. In October 1961, the mission president of the French Polynesian Mission, Kendall Young, traveled to Noumea to organize a branch. On Oct. 21, 1961 the Noumea Branch organized with Teahumanu Manoi called as president.

Through the 1960s, Tahitian was the primary language spoken by most members and was the language used in church services and literature. Without recognition, there were no missionaries sent by the church and the church couldn't buy land or build a meetinghouse. Members would meet in different theaters and a Chinese restaurant. On May 2, 1968, then Elder Thomas S. Monson stood on Mount Coffyn which overlooked the city of Noumea and the ocean and dedicated the land for the preaching of the gospel. In July 1968, the church received official recognition and was permitted to send the first two missionaries to the islands. On July 15, 1968 the first missionaries, a married couple arrived. On November 16, 1968, the first baptism in New Caledonia was Etienne Sun, then 13 and church service attendance was nearing 60. Younger missionaries first arrived on Jan. 20, 1969 and on Dec. 24, 1972, the Noumea Branch meetinghouse was dedicated.

In May 1976, the Naumea branch was divided (Tahitian and French language branches) and the meetinghouse was enlarged. In 1977, the District of New Caledonia. District includes the two branches of Noumea, and the branch of Tontouta. On March 3, 1973, Ricardo and Anita Gaya traveled to Hamilton New Zealand and were the first members from New Caledonia to be sealed in the temple. Seminary began in the 1970s and institute began in the 1980s. In the 1990's the number of missionaries in New Caledonia averages 10 companionships. President Gordon B. Hinckley visited New Caledonia on June 17, 2000 with 1,000 attending the conference.

On May 27, 2012, the Naumea New Caledonia Stake was organized with Georgie Guidi as President. On February 21, 2014, Elder Neil L. Andersen Visited New Caledonia. From June 2020 to July 2021, there were no full time missionaries in New Caledonia due to the COVID-19 Pandemic.

Stake and Congregations

As of February 2023, the following congregations met in New Caledonia:

Noumea New Caledonia Stake
Ducos Ward
Dumbéa Ward
Magenta Ward
Mont-Dore Ward
Rivière-Salée Ward
Tontouta Ward
Bourail Branch
Lifou Branch
Mare Branch

Missions
In June 1975, the New Caledonia and the Noumea Branch were transferred to the Fiji Suva Mission. On July 1, 2012, the Vanuatu Port Vila Mission which encompasses New Caledonia, Vanuatu, and The Solomon Islands was organized.

Temples
As of February 2023, New Caledonia was located in the Hamilton New Zealand Temple District. It is anticipated it will be located in the Port Vila Vanuatu Temple District once it's completed.

See also

The Church of Jesus Christ of Latter-day Saints membership statistics
The Church of Jesus Christ of Latter-day Saints in France
Religion in New Caledonia

References

External links
 The Church of Jesus Christ of Latter-day Saints (Pacific) - Official Site
 The Church of Jesus Christ of Latter-day Saints - Pacific Newsroom
 ComeUntoChrist.org Latter-day Saints Visitor site

Christianity in New Caledonia
New Caledonia